LoanMart Field (previously known as the City of Rancho Cucamonga Epicenter Entertainment & Sports Complex, or The Rancho Cucamonga Epicenter for short) is a stadium in Rancho Cucamonga, California. It is primarily used for baseball and is the home field of the Rancho Cucamonga Quakes minor league baseball team.  It was opened on April 3, 1993, with the nickname The Epicenter, and has a seating capacity of 6,588 people. While playing home games at the stadium since 1993, the Quakes have broken a number of stadium attendance records.

History

Construction
In 1992, the San Bernardino Spirit were playing at Fiscalini Field, when it was announced that a new ballpark would be built in Rancho Cucamonga for over $20 million. At the time, this was a large amount of money to spend on a new minor league ballpark. The Spirit (soon renamed the Quakes) jumped at the chance to play in this new ballpark and moved in 1993, switching their affiliation from the Seattle Mariners to the San Diego Padres.

Construction started on November 14, 1991, with much of the staff for the Quakes moving into trailers on the outskirts of the construction site. The process used 400 trucks of concrete, and over 95,000 cubic yards of dirt were moved. Officially named "The Quakes," the stadium was then nicknamed the "Epicenter." The team moved into the stadium on April 1, 1993.

Early seasons
The Rancho Cucamonga Quakes played their first game at the stadium on April 8 against the High Desert Mavericks, winning 7-3. Early demand for tickets was high, and on May 22, over 440 temporary bleacher seats were added to the stadium. By July, the team broke the California League attendance record of 218,444, ending the season with a record of 331,005, fourth of any Class-A team in the country, and better than any Class AA team that year. After that season, more seats were installed in the outfield area, bringing capacity over 6,000. After a championship win in 1994, attendance went up in 1995, with the team playing to a 97% filled capacity that year. In 1996, the Quakes again topped the attendance rate in the league for the fourth season in a row.

Recent years
After the completion of the 2009 season, the Quakes baseball team was sold to Brett Sports & Entertainment. In 2011 the team Quakes began a partnership with the Los Angeles Dodgers. As of 2014, the stadium's property encompasses a 52-acre sports complex. Its close proximity to the film studios of Los Angeles means a number of movies have been filmed there, and the stadium has also hosted concerts, non-baseball sporting events, vehicle shows and exhibitions, community events and festivals.

LoanMart

On April 3, 2013, it was announced that the chain LoanMart had signed a ten-year sponsorship and naming rights deal with the franchise, renaming the ballpark LoanMart Field. Founded in 2002, 1-800LoanMart is a direct financer and lending company based in Encino. The company operates as a "non-traditional" lending service to car-owners; instead of looking at credit scores to establish eligibility for loans, the company uses the actual value of the client's vehicle and the client's ability to repay the loan as collateral, while allowing use of the car. As of March 2014 the company has over 330 employees and does business in California, Arizona, New Mexico, Utah, Illinois, and Missouri.  LoanMart also sponsors other sports-related franchises including NASCAR Sprint Cup.

Other sponsors of the stadium and team beyond LoanMart include Allstar KIA, Budweiser, the California National Guard, Pepsi, and many other diverse companies.

Improvements
2008–2009
Between the 2008 and 2009 seasons, the existing seats were replaced, with the old seats recycled, sealing all the cracks and holes in the concrete around the entire stadium, and installing the new and improved seats into place. There are no changes in the capacity for the stadium. However, the numbers on the first base side (sections 3, 5, 7, 9, 11, 13 and 15) are numbered differently from before. The sections now have the number one on the right when facing the field and the largest number of the row on the left when facing the field. The new seats are navy blue and are equipped with a cup holder for each seat. The lower levels, Super Box and Field Box, are now padded.

2011–present
Prior to the 2012 season, the stadium's home and away clubhouses underwent major renovations to meet Minor League Baseball standards. The home clubhouse was renamed the Tommy Lasorda Clubhouse on March 28, 2013, before the start of a special exhibition game between the Quakes and their MLB affiliate, the Los Angeles Dodgers.

During the offseason leading up to the 2013 season, the stadium's left field bleachers were removed in favor of the Batting Cage Terrace, where fans can watch players take batting practice in an open batting cage adjacent to the home bullpen. During the games, fans have the opportunity to take abbreviated batting practice rotations.

Further reading

References

External links

 Official website
 Rancho Cucamonga Epicenter Views - Ball Parks of the Minor Leagues

Sports venues in San Bernardino County, California
Sports venues in the Inland Empire
Minor league baseball venues
Baseball venues in California
Sports in Rancho Cucamonga, California
Sports venues completed in 1993
1993 establishments in California
California League ballparks